Sukha is a Sanskrit and Pāli word that is often translated as “happiness" or "ease" or "pleasure" or "bliss."

Sukha may also refer to:

 Sukhdev Singh Sukha, Indian assassin
 Sukha Singh
 Labh Singh, also known as Sukha Sipahi, former Punjab police officer
 Surat Sukha, Thai footballer
 Suree Sukha, Thai footballer